Nidigattu is a suburb situated in  Visakhapatnam City, India. The area is quite close to the Kapuluppada.  this area is in Bheemunipatnam mandal

References

Neighbourhoods in Visakhapatnam